Erebus maurus is a moth of the family Erebidae. It is found in Indonesia (Wetar).

References

Moths described in 1917
Erebus (moth)